Samaneh Khoshghadam (born on 1 April 1983 in Tehran) is an Iranian karateka. The champions like Hamideh Abbasali and Taravat Khaksar are her trainees. 
She began Karate at the age of 16 . Since 2003, she became a member of the Iran karate national women's team. She is now the head coach of Iranian karate women's national team.

Coaching background

Olympic Games 
 Head coach of Iran's Karate national team in Premier league 2021 lisbon and getting 2 quota's 2020 Summer Olympics Tokyo.
At the 2020 Summer Olympics Tokyo, she was the head coach of the Iranian women's karate team. Her students Hamideh Abbasali in +61 kg weight with 2 wins and 2 losses, could not get a medal and stood in 7th place. Also Sara Bahmanyar in -55kg weight with 1 win and 1 loss stood in 5th place.
 Head coach of Iran's Karate national team in 2018 Croatia Youth Premier league and getting 3 quota's Youth Olympic Games 2018 Buenos Aires.
 Head coach of Iran's Karate national team in 2018 Buenos Aires Youth Olympic Games, and getting 3 bronze medals by Negin Altooni, Fateme Khonakdar, Mobina Heydari

World Karate Championships 
 Head coach of Iran's under-23 karate national team in 2017 Spain - World Karate Championships and winner of one gold and one silver individual medals and totally the fifth place of the world.

Islamic Solidarity Games 
 Coach of Iran's adult karate national team in 2017 Islamic Solidarity Games and winner of one individual gold medal and two individual bronze medals.

International University Sports Federation|FISU 
 Head coach of Iran's students karate national team in 2018 World University Karate Championships - Japan and winner of the second place.
 coach of Iran's students karate national team in  2014 World University Karate Championships  - Montenegro  and ranked the first.

Asian Karate Championships 
 Head coach of Iran's Cadet and Junior national teams in Asian Karate Championships - 2018 Okinawa and winner of the first place.
 Coach of Iran's under-23 and adult  karate national team in 2017 Asian Karate Championships - Astana, Kazakhstan and winner of four gold, one silver and two bronze medal, and totally, earned Asia's second ranked.
 Head coach of Iran's under-23 national team in Asian karate championships Indonesia 2016 and winner of one gold, one silver and two bronze, and totally, ranked the second place of Asia.

References

External links 
 IKF/head coach of the women's karate team
  En-Mehr-Nwes
  Irans women karate team wins asian title
 Official website
 karate record
 wkf ranking 
 instagrm page of khoshghdam
 Youtube

1983 births
Sportspeople from Tehran
Living people
Iranian female karateka
20th-century Iranian women
21st-century Iranian women